A larva is a juvenile form in biology that has little if any resemblance to its adult form.

Larva may also refer to:

 Larva (film), a 2005 American science fiction horror film
 Larva (TV series), a computer-animated television series made by TUBA Entertainment in Seoul, South Korea
 Larva (mask), or volto, a type of Venetian mask worn at the Carnival of Venice
 Larva, Spain, a municipality in the province of Jaén
 Larva (Vampire Princess Miyu), a Japanese manga and anime character

See also
 Larvae (Roman religion)
 Lava (disambiguation)